Bekasi Regency (Indonesian: Kabupaten Bekasi) is a regency (kabupaten) of West Java Province, Indonesia. Its regency seat is in the district of Central Cikarang. It is bordered by Jakarta and by Bekasi City (which is a separate administration from the Regency) to the west, by Bogor Regency to the south, and by Karawang Regency to the east.

The official estimate as at mid 2021 was 3,157,962. The earliest evidence of the existence of Bekasi dates from the 5th century according to the Tugu inscription, which describes the name of two rivers that run through the city, i.e. Candrabhaga and Gomati and one of those rivers, i.e. Candrabhaga is the origin of the name Bekasi where the name Candrabhaga evolved into Bhagasasi due to the Sanskrit word candra which means moon evolved into Old Javanese word ‘sasi’ which also means moon and then the name Bhagasasi was misspelled as Bhagasi and then Dutch colonial government also misspelled the name Bhagasi as Bacassie and finally it became Bekasi.

History 
During the colonial era, Bekasi was dominated by particuliere landerijen ('private domains'; Indonesian: tanah partikelir) which came under the rule of Landheeren (landlords). The landlords could impose taxation (cuke), tribute (upeti) and force labor (rodi) on the inhabitants of their private estates.

Among the most powerful gentry families in Bekasi was the Khouw family of Tamboen (Indonesian: keluarga Khouw van Tamboen). They ruled their extensive landholdings from their country house, landhuis Tamboen (now Gedung Juang Tambun).

Administrative districts 

Bekasi Regency is divided into 23 districts (kecamatan), tabulated below with their areas and their populations at the 2010 Census and the 2020 Census, and as at the official estimate for mid 2021. The table also includes the number of administrative villages (desa and kelurahan) in each district, and its post code.

List of companies

Cikarang Pusat (Central Cikarang) District 
 PT Suzuki Indomobil Motor

Cibitung District 
 Panasonic
 PT Astra Honda Motor
 LG Electronics

Jababeka 

 Samsung
 PT. Kraftfoods Indonesia
 Showa
 PT. Unilever Tbk.
 Kao Indonesia

EJIP 

 Omron
 MEI ( Matsumoto Electronic Indonesia )
 Haier
 Musashi
 AISIN

BIIE 

 LG Innotek Indonesia
 Enkei
 Sanoh

Newton Techno Park 
 Guna Era
 Fata Metal
 Matahari Alka
 PPA (Priuk Perkasa Abadi)
 Takita

Toll Road Access

References